Merivale Road is an arterial road in the west end of Ottawa, Ontario, Canada. It starts at Island Park Drive just north of Highway 417 and continues south until it ends at Prince of Wales Drive in Rideau Glen. South of Clyde Avenue, Merivale is known as Ottawa Road #17, while north of Clyde it is Ottawa Road #63.

From Island Park Drive to Carling Avenue the road is as a small collector route, passing the Westgate Shopping Centre. South of Carling Avenue it is a minor arterial road that goes through the Carlington residential neighborhood. It passes just west of the Central Experimental Farm, land owned by the federal Government of Canada.

South of Baseline Road, Merivale Road turns (it is actually the continuation of Clyde Avenue and Maitland Avenue) and becomes a major arterial route through a commercial district that contains several major malls, dozens of restaurants and radio and former CTV broadcast facilities (CJOH-TV, building structure was badly damaged by fire in 2010 and the building was demolished in 2011). During the 1950s through the 1990s prior to the City of Nepean's amalgamation with the city of Ottawa, this area of Merivale Road formed the largest commercial shopping district within the city of Nepean and a major shopping area for the National Capital region.  During the 1950s and 1960s several major department stores, such as Towers, Miracle Mart, Pascals, and Kmart, were located along Merivale Road along with major Canadian grocery chains such as Steinberg's and Dominion. The late 1970s saw the building of Merivale Mall at the intersection of Merivale and Viewmount Drive on the site of a former farm house and farm lands. It was home to a Woolco at the south end of the mall, one of its anchor stores.  The building of the Meadowlands Mall at the intersection of Merivale Road and Meadowlands Road took place around this time, before it contained large box stores.

This area of Merivale Road also leads to the City of Nepean's first experiment in promoting industrial development through the creation of industrial parks.  The Colonnade Road Industrial Park at the intersection of Merivale and Colonnade lies just to the south of Viewmount Road and is/was the location for branches, production facilities and headquarters of many large high tech companies such as Gandalf Technologies, and Mitel as well as OC Transpo's south west garage facilities.  Through the 1980s it was also home to Ottawa's largest Flea Market at the time, the Colonnade Flea Market (the Flea Market has since been renamed to the Bentley Flea Market and relocated further south on Merivale to 7 Cleopatra Drive).

During the 1990s another major commercial area was developed further south on Merivale road located at the intersection of Hunt Club Road.  This was precipitated by the extension of the Hunt Club Road west across the Rideau River creating a new intersection with Merivale Road in what used to be a rural farming field.  This area includes various national retailers such as Canadian Tire, Petsmart, Rona, Costco and the Brick as well as various restaurant chains such as Boston Pizza and Eastside Mario's, fast food places such as Burger King and A&W, car dealerships, workout gyms and smaller specialty stores.

South of Hunt Club Road, Merivale runs through an industrial district with many small businesses which during the 1970s and 1980s was the second location for intense industrial development led by the City of Nepean. This area also contains extensive petroleum storage facilities, and brownfield sites where such facilities once stood.

South of the intersection of Merivale and Slack Road, Merivale passes the neighbourhoods of Pineglen and Country Place and then crosses the greenbelt; an area protected from further urban development.  South of this Merivale, passes through Rideau Glen, part of the growing subdivision of Barrhaven.

Speed limits
Speed limits vary throughout this long stretch:
 Between Island Park Drive and the Central Experimental Farm, the speed limit is 50 km/h.
 Between the Central Experimental Farm and MacFarlane Road in the industrial district the speed limit is 60 km/h.
 A small section afterwards has a speed limit of 50 km/h while the rest of the road from north of Fallowfield Road to Prince of Wales Drive the speed limit is 80 km/h.

Bus routes
Merivale Road is well served by OC Transpo bus service as follows:
 Route 53  travels between Summerville Avenue and Kirkwood Avenue during Westbound trips, and between Caldwell Avenue and Summerville Avenue during Eastbound trips.
 Route 80 travels between Carling Avenue and Leiken Drive, though some Monday-Friday trips do not travel between MacFarlane Road and Leiken Drive.
 Route 81 travels between Caldwell Avenue and Central Park Drive, and again between Central Park Drive and Clyde Avenue.
 Route 83 travels between Viewmount Drive and Woodfield Drive.
 Route 89 travels between Viewmount Drive and Colonnade Road.
 Route 96 travels between Viewmount Drive and MacFarlane Road, though some Saturday/Sunday trips do not travel between Hunt Club Road and MacFarlane Road. 
 Route 186 travels between Meadowlands Drive and Slack Road during peak hours Monday-Friday only.
 Route 187 travels between Slack Road and Amberwood Crescent during peak hours Monday-Friday only.
 Route 199 travels between Hunt Club Road and Leiken Drive during peak hours Monday-Friday only.

Major intersections

 Carling Avenue
 Kirkwood Avenue
 Baseline Road
 Clyde Avenue
 Meadowlands Drive
 Hunt Club Road
 Fallowfield Road
 Prince of Wales Drive

Future
There are plans to widen this road to four lanes from MacFarlane Road to Fallowfield Road in the future due to the increasing size of Barrhaven.

Roads in Ottawa